The following tables show the List of world records in athletics progression in the 100K run, as recognised by World Athletics. The 100K run was introduced as a world record event in January 2004.

World record progression

Key to tables

Men

Women

Women only race

Mixed gender race

See also
Ultramarathon
IAU 100 km World Championships

References

100 km